The European Spallation Source ERIC (ESS) is a multi-disciplinary research facility based on the world's most powerful pulsed neutron source. It is currently under construction in Lund, Sweden. The ESS Data Management and Software Centre (DMSC) will be located in Copenhagen, Denmark. The 13 European member countries act as partners in the construction and operation of ESS. ESS will start the scientific user programme in 2023, and the construction phase will be complete by 2025. ESS is the world's most powerful next-generation neutron source, and will enable scientists to see and understand basic atomic structures and forces at length and time scales unachievable at other neutron sources.

The research infrastructure, owned by 13 European nations, is built close to the Max IV Laboratory.  The colocation of powerful neutron and X-ray facilities is a productive strategy (e.g. the Institut Laue–Langevin with the European Synchrotron Radiation Facility; the ISIS Neutron and Muon Source with the Diamond Light Source), because much of the knowledge, technical infrastructure, and scientific methods associated with neutron and X-ray technologies are similar.

The construction of the facility began in the summer of 2014 and the first science results produced are planned for 2023. Scientists and engineers from more than 100 partner laboratories are working on updating and optimising the advanced technical design of the ESS facility, and at the same time are exploring how to maximise its research potential. These partner laboratories, universities and research institutes are also contributing human resources, knowledge, equipment, and financial support through In-Kind Contributions.

ESS will use nuclear spallation, a process in which neutrons are liberated from heavy elements by high energy protons.  This is intrinsically a much safer process than uranium fission.  Unlike existing facilities, the ESS is neither a "short pulse" (micro-seconds) spallation source, nor a continuous source like the SINQ facility in Switzerland, but the first example of a "long pulse" source (milli-seconds) 

.

The future facility is composed of a linear accelerator in which protons are accelerated and collide with a rotating, helium-cooled tungsten target. By this process, intense pulses of neutrons are generated.  Surrounding the tungsten are baths of cryogenic hydrogen which feed neutron supermirror guides.  These operate in a similar way to optical fibres, directing the intense beams of neutrons to experimental stations, where research is done on different materials.  Many of the instruments benefit from more than a decade of development, and several of the designs are unique in order to maximise the benefits of the long pulse.

Neutron scattering can be applied to a range of scientific questions, spanning the realms of physics, chemistry, geology, biology and medicine. Neutrons serve as a unique probe for revealing the structure and function of matter from the microscopic down to the atomic scale. Using neutrons for research enables us to investigate the world around us as well as to develop new materials and processes to meet the needs of society. Neutrons are frequently used to address the grand challenges, to improve and develop new solutions for health, the environment, clean energy, IT and more.

ESS became a European Research Infrastructure Consortium, or ERIC, on 1 October 2015. The European Spallation Source ERIC is "a joint European organisation committed to constructing and operating the world's leading facility for research using neutrons."

ESS is designed to be carbon-neutral and is expected to reduce CO2 emissions in the region.

Though it is just over half way through the construction project, the ESS is already a scientifically productive organisation.  Many world-leading experts are either directly employed or linked to the project via collaborations, and working on pressing societal problems.  Examples include the determination of protein structure in COVID-19  and the provision of deuteration services to other scientists.

The European Investment Bank made a €50 million investment in European Spallation Source. This investment is supported by InnovFin-EU Finance for Innovators, an initiative established by the EIB Group in collaboration with the European Commission under Horizon 2020, the EU's research and innovation program.

History

When the ISIS neutron source was built in England in 1985, its radical success in producing indirect images of molecular structures eventually raised the possibility of a far more powerful spallation source. By 1993, the European Neutron Scattering Association began to advocate what would be the most ambitious and broad-based spallation source in the world, ESS.

Neutron science soon became a critical tool in the development of industrial and consumer products worldwide. So much so that the Organization for Economic Development (OECD), declared in 1999 that a new generation of high-intensity neutron sources should be built, one each in North America, Asia and Europe.  Europe's challenge was its diverse collection of national governments, and an active research community numbering in the thousands. In 2001, a European roadmap for developing accelerator driven systems for nuclear waste incineration estimated that the ESS could have the beam ready for users in 2010. A European international task force gathered in Bonn in 2002 to review the findings and a positive consensus emerged to build ESS. The stakeholders group met a year later to review the task force's progress, and in 2003 a new design concept was adopted that set the course for beginning operations by 2019.

Over the next five years a competitive and yet collaborative site selection process played out and Lund, Sweden was chosen as the preferred site; the definitive selection of Lund was announced in Brussels on 28 May 2009. On 1 July 2010, the staff and operations of ESS Scandinavia were transferred from Lund University to 'European Spallation Source ESS AB', a limited liability company set up to design, construct and operate the European Spallation Source in Lund. The company's headquarters are situated in central Lund.

ESS became a European Research Infrastructure Consortium, or ERIC, on 1 October 2015. The Founding Members of the European Spallation Source ERIC are the Czech Republic, Denmark, Estonia, France, Germany, Hungary, Italy, Norway, Poland, Spain, Sweden, Switzerland and United Kingdom.

As of 2013 the estimated cost of the facility will be about €1.843 bn. Host nations Sweden and Denmark plan to give about half of the sum. However the negotiations about the exact contributions from every partner are still in progress. From 2010 to 30 September 2015, ESS was operated as a Swedish aktiebolag, or AB.

Site selection

Originally, three possible ESS sites were under consideration: Bilbao (Spain), Debrecen (Hungary) and Lund (Sweden).

On 28 May 2009, seven countries indicated support for placing ESS in Sweden. Furthermore, Switzerland and Italy indicated that they would support the site in majority. On 6 June 2009, Spain withdrew the Bilbao candidacy and signed a collaboration agreement with Sweden, supporting Lund as the main site, but with key component development work being performed in Bilbao. This effectively settled the location of the ESS; detailed economical negotiations between the participating countries are now taking place.  On 18 December 2009, Hungary also chose to tentatively support ESS in Lund, thus withdrawing the candidacy of Debrecen.

The construction of the facility began in early 2014, with a groundbreaking event held in September of that year. The user programme will start in 2023, and it is planned to be fully operational by 2025. ESS provides weekly updates of construction progress and live construction site webcams on its website.

The Linear Accelerator

The ESS uses a linear accelerator (linac) to accelerate a beam of protons from the exit of its ion source at 75 keV to 2 GeV, at the entrance of the accelerator protons are traveling at ~1% of the speed of light and at the end of the accelerator, they reach a velocity of ~95% speed of light. 
The accelerator uses both normal conducting and superconducting cavities.

The normal conducting cavities are Radio Frequency Quadrupole, RFQ, working at a frequency of 352.21 MHz, and accelerating the proton beam up to an energy of 3.62 MeV. The next structure is a transport line for the medium energy protons, MEBT which transports the beam from the RFQ to the next structure for further acceleration. In the MEBT the beam properties are measured, the beam is cleaned from the transverse halo around the beam, and also the head and tail of the beam pulse are cleaned using a transversally deflecting electromagnetic chopper. The Drift Tube Linac, DTL, which is the structure downstream of the MEBT accelerates the beam further to ~90 MeV. At this energy, there is a transition from normal conducting cavities to superconducting cavities.

Three families of superconducting cavities accelerate the beam to its final energy of 2 GeV, firstly a section using double-spoke cavities up to an energy of ~216 Mev, then two families of elliptical cavities which are optimized for medium and high energy proton acceleration at a frequency of 704.42 MHz. Following the elliptical cavities, a transfer-line guides the beam to the target, and just before sending the beam to the target for producing spallation neutrons expands the beam and paints the target to dissipate the generated heat over a larger area.

The linac repetition rate is 14 Hz, and the pulses of protons are 2.86 ms long, making the duty factor of the linac 4%. The beam current within the pulse is 62.5 mA, and the average beam current is 2.5 mA.

Except in the RFQ which uses the same structure and field to accelerate and focus the beam, the transverse focusing of the beam of protons is performed using magnetic lenses. In the low energy beam transport, right after the ion source, magnetic solenoids are used, in the DTL permanent quadrupole magnets are used and the rest of the linac uses electromagnetic quadrupoles.

The spallation target and its environmental impact
The ESS source will be built around a solid tungsten target, cooled by helium gas.
 Radioactive substances will be generated by the spallation process, but the solid target makes the handling of these materials easier and safer than if a liquid target had been used.
 ESS, E.on, and Lunds Energi are collaborating in a project aiming to get the facility to be the world's first completely sustainable large-scale research centre through investment in wind power. The ESS project is expected to include an extension of the Nysted Wind Farm.
 Radioactive material storage and transport will be required, but the need is much less than that of a nuclear reactor.
ESS expects to be CO2-neutral. 
Recent design improvements will decrease energy usage at ESS.

Neutron Scattering and Imaging Instruments at ESS

The target station is surrounded by instrument halls with scientific instruments placed in four sections in the cardinal directions. In the western section, science instruments are located 156 meters from the center of the target station. In the southern one, the distance is between 50 and 80 meters, and the science instruments located closest to the target station are in the northern and eastern sections.

Initially, 15 different scientific instruments will be erected:

Large-scale structures:
 ODIN (Imaging)
 SKADI (General purpose SANS)
 LoKI (Broadband SANS)
 FREIA (Horizontal reflectometer)
 ESTIA (Vertical reflectometer)

Diffraction:
 HEIMDAL (Powder diffractometer)
 DREAM (Powder diffractometer)
 BEER (Engineering diffractometer)
 MAGiC (Magnetism diffractometer)
 NMX (Macromolecular diffractometer)

Spectroscopy:
 CSPEC (Cold chopper spectrometer)
 T-REX (Thermal chopper spectrometer)
 BIFROST (Crystal analyser spectrometer)
 VESPA (Vibrational spectrometer)
 MIRACLES (Backscattering spectrometer)

ESSnuSB 
The ESS neutrino super beam project aims to generate the most powerful neutrino beam in the world.

See also
 ISIS neutron source — Europe's only pulsed spallation source
 J-PARC - The world's most powerful spallation source, located in Japan
 MAX IV —  synchrotron radiation facility in Lund
 Spallation Neutron Source

References

Further reading 
S. Peggs et al. ESS Technical Design Report, April 2013.
European Spallation Source. European Spallation Source Activity Report 2015, April 2015.
European Spallation Source. Feature Series: The ESS Instrument Suite, 2014–2015.
 Hallonsten, O. 2012. Introduction: In pursuit of a Promise. In O. Hallonsten (ed.) In pursuit of a Promise: Perspectives on the political process to establish the European Spallation Source (ESS) in Lund, Sweden (pp 11–19). Lund: Arkiv Academic Press, 2012, p. 12.
 Prolingheuer, N.; Herbst, M.; Heuel-Fabianek, B.; Moormann, R.; Nabbi, R.; Schlögl, B., Vanderborght, J. 2009: Estimating Dose Rates from Activated Groundwater at Accelerator Sites. Nuclear Technology, Vol. 168, No. 3, December 2009, p. 924-930
 Heuel-Fabianek, B. 2014: Partition Coefficients (Kd) for the Modelling of Transport Processes of Radionuclides in Groundwater (PDF; 9,4 MB)  JÜL-Berichte, Forschungszentrum Jülich, Nr. 4375, 2014, ISSN 0944-2952
T. Parker. ESS Environmental Design Report, January 2013.

External links
European Spallation Source website. The most up-to-date source for information on the ESS project.
Weekly updates of the construction of ESS and live webcams at the construction site.
 
 essworkshop.org - See how the design of instrumentation for a future ESS-Scandinavia is moving forward.
BrightnESS, EU grant project in support of ESS.
SREss, EU grant project in support of ESS.

Lund
Lund University
Neutron scattering
Nuclear physics
Neutron facilities
Particle physics facilities
2019 in Sweden